The Museum of Art Fakes is a museum of faked and forged artworks that opened in Vienna, Austria in 2005.  This small, privately run museum in the Landstraße district is the only one of its kind in the German-speaking world.

The exhibits include works by the renowned Vermeer-forger Han van Meegeren and the British art restorer Tom Keating, who claimed to have faked over 2,000 works by more than 100 different artists and deliberately inserted "time bombs" and anachronisms into his paintings.  Also on display are items produced by Konrad Kujau, creator of the fake Hitler Diaries, as well as works by David Stein, Elmyr de Hory, Eric Hebborn and Lothar Malskat.  In addition, the museum presents information on the history of the most famous forgeries, and the sometimes very dramatic fates of their creators.

See also
Art forgery

Notes

External links
 Home page in English

Art museums and galleries in Vienna
Art museums established in 2005
Museum of Art Fakes
Museum of Art Fakes
21st-century architecture in Austria